The 2009 FIA WTCC Marriott Race of the Czech Republic was the sixth round of the 2009 World Touring Car Championship season and the fourth running of the FIA WTCC Race of the Czech Republic. It was held on 21 June 2009 at the Masaryk Circuit near Brno, Czech Republic. BMW Team Italy-Spain won both races with Alex Zanardi winning the first race and Sergio Hernández winning the second race.

Background
Coming into the round, SEAT Sport driver Yvan Muller was leading the drivers' championship by a three-point margin over BMW Team Germany's Augusto Farfus. Tom Coronel was leading the Yokohama Independents' Trophy.

Tom's twin brother Tim Coronel joined SUNRED Engineering for the event to make his WTCC debut. Exagon Engineering and their driver Mehdi Bennani missed the round before returning at the Race of Portugal.

Report

Free practice
BMW cars dominated first practice taking the top five positions on Saturday morning. In wet conditions, Andy Priaulx was fastest just under 0.15s ahead of Zanardi. Rickard Rydell was the fastest SEAT drive in sixth place and the fastest Chevrolet was that of Nicola Larini in seventh.

BMW filled the top four places in the second free practice session with Farfus setting the fastest time. SEAT cars filled the next five places, led by Gabriele Tarquini while the fastest Chevrolet was Robert Huff in tenth. The track was still damp after the morning but it was drying as the session progressed.

Qualifying
Farfus took his third pole position of the year with Priaulx alongside him on the front row. Behind them were Zanardi and the fastest Chevrolet of Larini. Only two SEATs made it through to Q2, Rydell lined up fifth and Tarquini sixth. Scuderia Proteam Motorsport driver Félix Porteiro was the fastest independent lining up tenth. Priaulx had been fastest in Q1 but changing weather conditions favoured Farfus later on. Out in Q1 were SEAT Sport drivers Tiago Monteiro, Jordi Gené and points leader Yvan Muller.

Warm-Up
Farfus was quickest in Sunday mornings warm up session with BMW cars in the top five positions.

Race One
Farfus moved to the left at the start, collecting Priaulx, Huff, Larini and Gené before beaching himself in the gravel trap. Priaulx limped back to the pits minus his front bumper and with broken front suspension while Farfus, Huff and Larini were stuck at turn one. The incident allowed Tarquini and Zanardi to pass up the inside and continue. Tarquini led away from the restart before Zanardi quickly passed the SEAT and pulled away into the lead. Zanardi took victory at Brno for the second consecutive year while Jörg Müller had climbed up from eleventh to second ahead of Tarquini. Porteiro was the winning Yokohama Independent driver and Yvan Muller finished eighth to secure pole position for race two.

Race Two
Starting on the front row, Porteiro moved into the lead at the start while Hernández then took second from pole sitter Yvan Muller. The leading pair ran close together and on lap three Hernández made his move to take the lead. Porteiro dropped down to fourth on lap four when he was passed by Muller and Monteiro. Behind them, a battle for fifth place was developing between BMW pair Priaulx and Müller and SEAT pair Tarquini and Rydell. While the BMW duo were contesting fifth place, Tarquini and Rydell overtook the pair of them. At the line Hernández took his first ever WTCC win with Muller second and Monteiro third, fourth place for Porteiro secured him the independents' win.

Results

Qualifying

Race 1

Bold denotes Fastest lap.

Race 2

Bold denotes Fastest lap.

Championship standings

Drivers' Championship standings

Yokohama Independents' Trophy standings

Manufacturers' Championship standings

 Note: Only the top five positions are included for both sets of drivers' standings.

References

External links
Results Booklet PDF at MST Systems

Czech Republic
FIA WTCC Race of the Czech Republic